Carichí is one of the 67 municipalities of Chihuahua, in northern Mexico. The municipal seat lies at Carichí. The municipality covers an area of 2,782 km².

As of 2010, the municipality had a total population of 8,795, up from 7,944 as of 2005.

As of 2010, the town of Carichí had a population of 1,672. Other than the town of Carichí, the municipality had 315 localities, none of which had a population over 1,000.

Geography

Towns and villages

References

Municipalities of Chihuahua (state)